Pathu Thala is an upcoming Indian Tamil-language neo-noir gangster film directed by Obeli N. Krishna. The film stars Silambarasan, Gautham Karthik, Gautham Vasudev Menon, Priya Bhavani Shankar, Anu Sithara, Teejay Arunasalam,  Kalaiyarasan and Redin Kingsley . It is a remake  of the 2017 Kannada film, Mufti. The title of the film was announced on 24 December 2020. 

The film is scheduled to be released theatrically on 30 March 2023.

Cast 
 Silambarasan as AG Raavanan  (AGR)
 Gautham Karthik
 Gautham Vasudev Menon
 Priya Bhavani Shankar as AGR's sister
 Anu Sithara
 Teejay Arunasalam
 Kalaiyarasan
 Madhu Guruswamy
 Redin Kingsley
 Manushyaputhiran
 Sendrayan
 Namo Narayana

Production 
Silambarasan who was simultaneously shooting for Gautham Vasudev Menon’s Vendhu Thanindhathu Kaadu was reported to team up for a film with Obeli N Krishna who previously directed films like Sillunu Oru Kaadhal and Nedunchaalai. The first look poster of the film was released on 19 January 2021.

The shooting of the film began in August 2021 but it has been postponed so many times, the shooting resumed in July 2022.  Major portions of Silambarasan was shot near Bellary Palace in the Mysore district in Karnataka. In October 2022, it was reported that the Karnataka schedule of the film was wrapped. The second schedule of the film began in Chennai on 13 August 2022 with Gautham Karthik joining the sets. The final schedule of the film was reported to begin on July and was reported to complete in August 2022. On 23 November 2022, the entire shooting of the film was wrapped.

Post production works of the film began in December 2022. Gautham Karthik and Priya Bhavani Shankar completed dubbing for their portions on 22 December 2022 and 3 January 2023 respectively.

Music 
The music of the film is composed by A. R. Rahman which marks his second collaboration with the director after Sillunu Oru Kaadhal and his fifth collaboration with Silambarasan after Vinnaithaandi Varuvaayaa (2010), Achcham Yenbadhu Madamaiyada (2016), Chekka Chivantha Vaanam (2018) and Vendhu Thanindhathu Kaadu (2022). The first single titled "Namma Satham" was released on 3 February 2023 coinciding with Silambarasan’s birthday. The second single titled 'Ninaivirukka' was released on 13 March 2023.

Release

Theatrical 
The film is scheduled to be released theatrically on 30 March 2023. Initially the film was scheduled to be released theatrically on 14 December 2022, but the film's release was postponed.

Home media 
The post-theatrical streaming rights of the film were sold to Amazon Prime Video, while the satellite rights were sold to Star Network.

References

External links 
 
 Pathu Thala

Films shot in Karnataka
2023 films
Films scored by A. R. Rahman
Films shot in Chennai
2020s Tamil-language films
Tamil remakes of Kannada films